The Little Dipper is a junior steel roller coaster located at Conneaut Lake Park in Conneaut Lake, Pennsylvania, United States.

The coaster was built by the Allan Herschell Company and began operating in the 1950s. The coaster has one three-car train. Riders are seated two across with two rows per car, giving the coaster a capacity of 12 riders.

References

Roller coasters in Pennsylvania
Roller coasters introduced in 1950
1950s establishments in Pennsylvania